Lopez Island Airport  is a public use airport located three nautical miles (6 km) south of the central business district of Lopez, a village on Lopez Island in San Juan County, Washington, United States. It is owned by the Port of Lopez.

Facilities and aircraft 
It has one runway designated 16/34 with an asphalt surface measuring 2,904 by 60 feet (885 x 18 m).

For the 12-month period ending May 31, 2007, the airport had 31,500 aircraft operations, an average of 86 per day: 75% general aviation and 25% air taxi. At that time there were 34 aircraft based at this airport: 94% single-engine, 3% multi-engine and 3% helicopter.

Airlines and destinations

See also 
 Fishermans Bay/LPS Seaplane Base

References

External links 
 Lopez Island Airport at Washington State DOT
 Aerial image as of 21 July 1998 from USGS The National Map

Airports in Washington (state)
Airports in San Juan County, Washington